Poonch Medical College is a public medical college established in 2013, located in Trar Dewan, in suburban Rawalakot, Poonch District, Azad Kashmir, Pakistan. The college is affiliated with the University of Health Sciences Lahore, and the Pakistan Medical Commission. The college has two teaching hospitals: Shaikh Khalifa Bin Zayed Hospital in Rawalakot, and D.H.Q. Hospital in Hajira.

History 
The college was established in 2012, comprising a faculty of 11 professors and 18 assistant professors, with 62 students enrolling. Studies began in 2013, with the first class graduating in 2018. Previous principals of the college include Zia-Ur Rehman, and Shabeer Ahmed Chudhry.

Academics 
Poonch Medical College offers a course for a Bachelor of Medicine, Bachelor of Surgery (MBBS) degree. Its academic departments include Anatomy, Physiology, Biochemistry, Pathology, Pharmacology, Community Medicine, Medical Education, Surgery & Allied, Radiology, Orthopedic Surgery, Urology, Medicine & Allied, Gastroenterology, Psychiatry, Cardiology, Gynaecology and obstetrics, Ophthalmology, ENT, and Pediatrics.

In 2017, the college was ranked first in merit among all affiliates of the University of Health Sciences Lahore in the MBBS exams.

Campus 
 Poonch Medical College lacks its own building and is currently using a facility belonging to a government run polytechnic institute.

Student Life 
Notable student unions of the college include Gilgit Baltistan Medicos Union, and a branch of the national organisation SYNCH. Various societies exist on subjects such as literature, sports, and blood donation; among others.

Recognition 
Other than its affiliates, Poonch Medical College is recognized by the World Health Organization and is listed in the World Directory of Medical Schools.

See also 
Azad Jammu Kashmir Medical College
Mohtarma Benazir Bhutto Shaheed Medical College
List of medical schools in Pakistan

References 

Medical colleges in Azad Kashmir
Educational institutions established in 2013
2013 establishments in Pakistan